The Marine Megafauna Foundation (MMF) is a marine biology research and conservation nonprofit notable for discovering, researching, and protecting large marine animals including whale sharks, manta rays, sea turtles, whales, and dugongs.

MMF was founded in 2009 by marine biologists Andrea Marshall and Simon J Pierce in Tofo Beach, Mozambique. MMF operates globally, with permanent MMF research & conservation sites in Mozambique, Australia, Indonesia, and Florida, as well as other study-specific locations.

Notable discoveries, research, and conservation initiatives 

 Pioneered the use of photo identification and artificial intelligence to study and track populations of whale sharks and other marine animals. This has expanded to affiliated Citizen science programs such as Sharkbook and Manta Matcher.
 Discovered a new type of Manta, the "reef manta ray" (Manta alfredi)
 Added whale sharks, reef manta rays, and oceanic manta rays to the IUCN Red List of Threatened Species.
 Established the Inhambane Province Hope Spot in collaboration with Sylvia Earle's Mission Blue
 Documented the first sightings of the ornate eagle ray (Aetomylaeus vespertilio) in the Bazaruto Archipelago National Park, Inhambane Province, Mozambique
 Documented the first recorded sighting of a live Smalleye Stingray underwater in 2009 and then the first successful tag of "the World's biggest ocean stingray" in 2023. 
 Completed the first study of South Florida manta ray population, and created the first accurate 3D model of an accurate digital 3D manta ray model with the Digital Life Project and ANGARI Foundation.
 Discovered and raised international alarm about illegal Chinese fishing practices after a whale shark named "Hope" with a satellite tag tracked by MMF & Galapagos Whale Shark Project was captured and killed in Galapagos. This ultimately resulted in a significant expansion to the Marine Protected Zone around the Galapagos.
 Created the Ocean Guardians education project in Mozambique to "raise a generation of guardians who understand and cherish the ocean through community engagement", which has been recognized by UNESCO. "The pilot education project reached over 2300 young Mozambicans and 7 schools have adopted an integrated marine conservation curriculum since 2012."

References

External links 

 
 
 
 

Marine conservation organizations
Wildlife conservation organizations
Environmental organizations established in 2009